Grand National Hospital of Mauritania is the national hospital of Mauritania, situated in Nouakchott. It is located on the Avenue Gamal Abdel Nasser, opposite the Institut National de Recherches en Sante Publique and adjacent (east) to the Hôpital Sabah, near the Ministry of Energy headquarters.

References

Hospitals in Mauritania
Nouakchott